Alexander Bagrationi (also Aaron Bagrationi; born 13 July 1990, in Ternopil, Ukraine) is a chess player and grandmaster from Ukraine who has represented Israel since 2020. 

Bagrationi was born in Ternopil and graduated from Ternopil National Economic University. He was awarded the International Master title in 2009. He moved to Israel in 2011, and achieved the Grandmaster title in 2014. He won the Jerusalem chess championship in 2018. He has lived in Germany since 2019.

Notable Tournaments

References

External links 

 
 
 

Living people
1990 births
Israeli chess players
Ukrainian chess players
Sportspeople from Ternopil
Ternopil National Economic University alumni
Chess grandmasters